Tetley is a historic home and farm complex located near Somerset, Orange County, Virginia. It was built about 1843, and is a two-story, five-bay, hipped-roof brick house on an English basement. The house has Federal and Greek Revival style design elements.  The front facade features two-story, pedimented portico added in the early-20th century, along with a two-story west wing and polygonal bay.  Also on the property are the contributing two ante bellum slave houses, a brick summer kitchen, and an unusual octagonal frame ice house.

It was listed on the National Register of Historic Places in 1991.

References

Houses on the National Register of Historic Places in Virginia
Federal architecture in Virginia
Greek Revival houses in Virginia
Houses completed in 1843
Houses in Orange County, Virginia
National Register of Historic Places in Orange County, Virginia
1843 establishments in Virginia